Mohamed Farah Dalmar Yusuf "Mohamed Ali" (died 28 July 1988)  was a Somali military commander and revolutionary. He is known for his leadership within Western Somali Liberation Front, Afraad and later the Somali National Movement.

Yusuf acquired his first military experience in the ranks of the Palestine Liberation Organization. He also had taken part in the Lebanese Civil War. Upon his return to the Somali Republic he became the military leader of the Western Somali Liberation Front and was at the forefront of the 1977 invasion of Ethiopia by Somali forces.

In 1979 Mohamed Ali became the head of the Fourth Brigade of the Western Somali Liberation Front known as Afraad. 

Yusuf's is considered the first military commanders of SNM, and one of the first officers to cross the Somali-Ethiopian border and establish a permanent base for rebels in Ethiopia.

References

Somali nationalists
People of the Lebanese Civil War